, is a Japanese internet entrepreneur and a philanthropist, founded Japan's first mega mobile site, "girlswaler.com". Ohama also established "fashionwalker.com" with Japan's major portal site, Yahoo! Japan(SoftBank Group), became the president and CEO of the owning 17 group companies, Xavel Inc.(Branding Inc.)

The annual sales of all the companies owned were over 290 billion yen (US$270 million), which was later sold in 2011.

Ohama is also the producer and creative director of mega fashion event "Tokyo Girls Collection" and the "World Runway".

Biography
Fumitaro Ohama graduated from University of Southern California in 1997. During his study in USC, he produced a charity event for Great Hanshin earthquake in 1995 at USC and made donation to Kobe, which later leads to establishment of Kobe Collection, a fashion event to promote and rebuild Kobe city and economy.

He started working at Riviera Country Club (golf course at Los Angeles, CA)and became the chief project manager for "Nissan LA Open" and "US Senior Open 1998".

In 1999, Ohama started his first own company, Branding group for internet, fashion and wedding business in Japan, and also produced wedding of Ichiro Suzuki, MLB player of Miami Marlins.

In July 2005, Ohama initiated the Tokyo Girls Collection, Japan's mega fashion event. He also collaborated with GEISAI#9 of Takashi Murakami, contemporary artist, for later Tokyo Girls Collections. He also directed fashion and music collaboration event, Asia Girls Explosion, produced together with Yoshiki of X Japan. Today, the visitors of TGC has grown into 30,000 per day, 60,000 visitors for 2 days event. In 2011, he launched a new charity event series, WORLD RUNWAY Premiere in Singapore for Great East Japan Earthquake disaster and in 2015 for Kenya for local economy development.

He collaborated with various major companies such as SQUARE ENIX, SUMITOMO CORPORATION, and AOYAMA TRADING.

Ohama was awarded by many media such as Nikkei Internet award, HIGH-SERVICE BEST 300 and The 14th AMD award 2008 (contribution for digital industry in Japan) and others.

He is also introduced as the member of "Seven Samurai of New Japan Inc." by Reuters along with other notable Japanese companies such as DeNA, provider of mobile portal and e-commerce site and Yoshinoya, the major beef bowl restaurant.

References

External links
  girlswalker.com
  fashion walker
  Tokyo Girls Collection
  World Runway

1971 births
Living people
People from Tokyo
University of Southern California alumni
Japanese fashion